Carolyn Skoczen, married surname: Kooiman, is a Canadian former competitive figure skater. She is the 1977 World Junior, champion. She represented Windsor FSC.

As of 2016, she is a coach at the Skating Club of Vail in Vail, Colorado More currently 2019, she is coaching in Denver, CO at the Edge Ice Arena in Littleton, CO and at Ice Center at the Promenade in Westminster, CO

Competitive highlights

References

Navigation

Canadian female single skaters
Living people
World Junior Figure Skating Championships medalists
Year of birth missing (living people)

ja:キャロリン・スコッチェン